The African bullhead (Lophiobagrus cyclurus)  is a species of claroteid catfish endemic to Lake Tanganyika at the border of Burundi, the Democratic Republic of the Congo, Tanzania, and Zambia. This species grows to a length of  TL.

This species is nocturnal in habit, hiding amongst rocks during daylight hours.  The diet consists of small crustaceans, beetle larvae and chironomid larvae.  The mucus secreted by this species is toxic to other fishes.

References
 

Lophiobagrus
Claroteidae
Fish of Lake Tanganyika
Fish described in 1937
Taxa named by E. Barton Worthington
Taxa named by Kate Bertram
Taxonomy articles created by Polbot